Ally Hussein Msengi (born 20 December 2001) is a Tanzanian footballer who plays as a midfielder for Stellenbosch.

Club career
Msengi played one-and-a-half seasons with local club KMC in the top-flight league in Tanzania. In January 2020 he signed a three-year deal with South African Premier Division club Stellenbosch.

International career
Msengi represented Tanzania at all youth levels from under-15 to under-23. Tournaments include the 2016 U-16 AIFF Youth Cup, the 2017 Africa U-17 Cup of Nations (and its qualification) and the 2019 CECAFA U-20 Championship.

He made his senior international debut on 11 October 2020, coming on for Mbwana Samatta during a 1–0 friendly defeat to Burundi.

Honours

International
Tanzania U20
 CECAFA U-20 Championship: 2019

References

External links
 
 

2001 births
Living people
Tanzanian footballers
Tanzania youth international footballers
Tanzania international footballers
Association football midfielders
Kinondoni Municipal Council F.C. players
Stellenbosch F.C. players
Moroka Swallows F.C. players
South African Premier Division players
Tanzanian expatriate footballers
Tanzanian expatriate sportspeople in South Africa
Expatriate soccer players in South Africa
Tanzania under-20 international footballers
Tanzanian Premier League players